

Regina Doman is a Christian writer who was born in 1970 in Havertown, Pennsylvania.

Doman graduated in 1988 from Koinoinia Academy of Warren, New Jersey. She received her bachelor's degree in 1992 from Franciscan University of Steubenville with a major in TV Communications and concentrations in drama and scriptwriting.

After graduating from university, she worked for two years as an assistant editor for Catholics United for the Faith in New York City. Three years later – in 1997 – she released her first novel, Snow White and Rose Red: A Modern Fairy Tale. In 2002, it was republished under the title The Shadow of the Bear. Its sequel, Black as Night, was published in 2004. In 2012, her manga biography of Pope Benedict XVI, Habemus Papem: Pope Benedict XVI, was published by American publisher Manga Hero. Along with Rebecca Bratten, Doman co-authored Catholic Philosopher Chick Makes Her Debut, published also in 2012.

Doman is a former editor with Sophia Institute Press.

She has produced audio dramas including Enemy Brothers, Perpetua's Choice, and her own book Shadow of the Bear.

Books
Snow White and Rose Red: A Modern Fairy Tale (1997), republished as The Shadow of the Bear (2002)
Black as Night (2004)
Angel in the Waters (2004)
Waking Rose (2007)
The Midnight Dancers (2008)
Alex O'Donnell and the 40 Cyber Thieves (2010)
Rapunzel Let Down (2013)
Habemus Papem: Pope Benedict XVI (2012)
Catholic Philosopher Chick Makes Her Debut (with Rebecca Bratten) (2012)
Pope Francis: I Believe in Mercy (2013)

References

Further reading

External links

Living people
1970 births
20th-century American novelists
21st-century American novelists
Franciscan University of Steubenville alumni
People from Delaware County, Pennsylvania
Novelists from Pennsylvania
American women novelists
20th-century American women writers
21st-century American women writers
Catholics from Pennsylvania